Lithophragma affine is a species of flowering plant in the saxifrage family known by the common name San Francisco woodland star. It is native to the coast of western North America from Oregon to Baja California, where it grows in open habitat on mountain slopes, hills, and canyonsides. It is a rhizomatous perennial herb growing erect or leaning with a tall naked flowering stem. The leaves are located on the lower part of the stem, each divided into sharp-pointed lobes. The stem bears up to 15 widely spaced flowers, each in a cuplike calyx of red or green sepals. The five petals are bright white, up to 1.3 centimeters long, and divided into three toothlike lobes at the tips.

External links
Jepson Manual Treatment
Photo gallery

affine
Flora of Baja California
Flora of California
Flora of Oregon
Flora without expected TNC conservation status